CSL Tecumseh is a self-unloading Panamax bulk carrier that entered service with Canada Steamship Lines (CSL) in 2013. The ship is currently registered in Nassau, Bahamas.

Design and description
CSL Tecumseh is the second of three sister ships of the s of the Panamax sub class. The ship has a gross tonnage of 43,691 tonnes and a deadweight tonnage of 71,319 tonnes.

Construction and career
CSL Tecumseh was built by Chengxi Shipyard in Jiangyin, China with the yard number 9703. She was completed in May 2013. The ship was delivered to CSL on 2 May 2013 and she began her maiden voyage on 7 May from China to Port McNeill, British Columbia, where she loaded a cargo of aggregates, to San Francisco, California.

References 

Bulk carriers
Canada Steamship Lines
Ships built in China
2012 ships